is a professional Japanese baseball player. He plays pitcher for the Hiroshima Toyo Carp.

External links

NPB.com

1991 births
Living people
Baseball people from Tottori Prefecture
People from Yonago, Tottori
Asia University (Japan) alumni
Japanese baseball players
Nippon Professional Baseball pitchers
Hiroshima Toyo Carp players